Ostružnica is a suburban settlement of Belgrade, Serbia, in the municipality of Čukarica. It has a population of 4,218 people (2011).

Geography
Ostružnica is located on the right bank of the Sava river, at the mouth of the Ostružnička reka, 14 km southwest of Belgrade, south of the Ada Ciganlija island.

History
Area of Ostružnica was a location of the Long Bridge, the first permanent bridge in Belgrade's history. As the opposing, Syrmian side across the Sava was a vast marsh at the time (modern New Belgrade), the bridge didn't stop at the bank but continued for some length above the swamp. Because of that, the people also called it the Bridge above the marsh (Most preko močvare). The bridge was built by the Austrians to help them conquer Belgrade from the Ottomans during the 1688 Siege of Belgrade. According to the records, a seasoned Belgrade master craftsman Đorđević "in only one month, with the help of his 400 workers, built the Long Bridge, using 2,000 tree trunks, 1,100 wooden piles, 15,500 bundles of palings and 12,000 palisade pickets." Right next to it, bit closer to the island of Ada Ciganlija, the Austrians constructed another, classical pontoon bridge, which "leaned on the Long Bridge".

Doljani is a former settlement that was located in the upper part of the Doljanski potok stream, between villages of Velika Moštanica, Meljak and Sremčica, just south of today's Ostružnica. It is widely held that Doljani was depopulated during the First Serbian Uprising, by Karađorđe due to the plague. Aćim Doljanac, Karađorđe's close cooperator and progenitor of the Doljančević family, moved to Ostružnica at that time.

During the First Serbian Uprising, Karađorđe, the leader of the rebellion, summoned the very first national assembly of Serbia in Ostružnica 24–28 April 1804.

Economy and infrastructure
Ostružnica has its own train station on the Belgrade's internal freight railway Batajnica–Surčin–Ostružnica–Železnik–Resnik, as the Sava is crossed by the railway bridge at Ostružnica. It is connected to the Belgrade's major freight train station and the Belgrade marshalling yard in Makiš.

A new Ostružnica road bridge, in the final stages of construction, was bombed during NATO air attacks on Yugoslavia in 1999 and wasn't finished until 2005. It represents one of the major sections of the Belgrade bypass.

A small neighborhood of Tarolit, named after the former factory, is located at the exit from Ostružnica in the Umka direction. Situated on the rim of the Sava's river bed, between the water and the Old Obrenovac Road, it is regularly flooded during the Sava's high water levels. In February 2022, it was announced that the residents will be resettled to other parts of Ostružnica.

Demographics

Ostružnica is classified as an urban settlement, with a fluctuating population count:

 1921: 1,497
 1961: 3,871
 1971: 4,011
 1981: 4,060
 1991: 3,628
 2002: 3,929
 2011: 4,218

References

Sources
 Mala Prosvetina Enciklopedija, Third edition (1985); Prosveta; 
 Jovan Đ. Marković (1990): Enciklopedijski geografski leksikon Jugoslavije; Svjetlost-Sarajevo; 
Aleksandar Bačko, Maleševci – clan with family feast on st. Ignatius day, Association of citizens “Serbian despot”, Series of Serbian ethnography and history, vol. 1, Belgrade 2007. (in Serbian: Малешевци – род који слави св. Игњатија)
Nikolić Rista T, Belgrade area, Serbian academy of sciences and arts, Serbian ethnographical series, vol. 5, Settlements and origin of inhabitants, vol. 2, Belgrade 1903. (in Serbian: Околина Београда)

External links

Suburbs of Belgrade
Šumadija
Čukarica